Marmaropus is a genus of beetles belonging to the family Curculionidae.

The species of this genus are found in Europe.

Species:
 Marmaropus besseri Gyllenhal, 1837 
 Marmaropus testaceitarsis Pic, 1908

References

Curculionidae
Curculionidae genera